The 2020 Biathlon Junior World Championships were held in Lenzerheide, Switzerland from 26 January to 2 February 2020. There was a total of 16 competitions: sprint, pursuit, individual and relay races for men and women.

Schedule
All times are local (UTC+1).

Results

Junior events

Junior Men

Junior Women

Youth events

Youth Men

Youth Women

Medal table

References

External links
Official website

Biathlon Junior World Championships
Junior World
Biathlon Junior World
Biathlon competitions in Switzerland
2020 in youth sport
January 2020 sports events in Switzerland
February 2020 sports events in Switzerland